This is a complete list of polychlorinated biphenyl (PCB) congeners.

PCB congener list

Explanation of PCB "descriptors"

Congener descriptors give a shorthand notation for geometry and substituent positions. The twelve congeners that display all four of the descriptors are referred to as being "dioxin-like", referring both to their toxicity and structural features which make them similar to 2,3,7,8-tetrachlorodibenzo-p-dioxin (2378-TCDD). Individual congeners are identified by the number and position of the chlorine atoms around the biphenyl rings.

CP0 / CP1
These 68 coplanar congeners fall into one of two groups. The first group of 20 congeners consists of those with chlorine substitution at none of the ortho positions on the biphenyl backbone and are referred to as CP0 or non-ortho congeners. The second group of 48 congeners includes those with chlorine substitution at only one of the ortho positions and are referred to as CP1 or mono-ortho congeners.

4CL
These 169 congeners have a total of four or more chlorine substituents, regardless of position.

PP
These 54 congeners have both para positions chlorinated.

2M
These 140 congeners have two or more of the meta positions chlorinated.

References

External links
 U.S. Environmental Protection Agency: PCB Congeners

Organochlorides
Biphenyls